Kathy Kelemen (born 27 June 1966) is a Canadian diver. She competed in the women's 10 metre platform event at the 1984 Summer Olympics and won bronze medals in each of the 1982 and 1986 Commonwealth Games.

Career
In November 1980, Kelemen was living in Richmond, British Columbia and by that time was being considered as among the province's top divers, having been victorious in her age category as well as the women's open events. Her highest score recorded was 397.25 in the 3-metre dives, which was comparable to the Olympic standard of 400 points. During the 1981 Canada Games, Kelemen won various events including the 1 and 3 metre springboard event. Former diver Irene MacDonald believed in 1981 that "she'll be world class, she really will be", describing her as a "coach's dream" due to her serious nature in wanting to train and undertake the difficult dives. In 1983, she was a member of the University of Calgary diving club and won three events at the invitational competition for the Pan American Games in Winnipeg, taking 1st place in three springboard dives which included two 1-metre and a 3-metre dive. In March 1985, she won the women's 10 metre platform dive event at the senior Winter National Diving Championships with a score of 531.96.

Personal
Kelemen was born in Czechoslovakia and has lived in Australia and Ontario, Canada.

References

External links
 

1966 births
Living people
Canadian female divers
Olympic divers of Canada
Divers at the 1984 Summer Olympics
Sportspeople from Bratislava
Divers at the 1982 Commonwealth Games
Divers at the 1986 Commonwealth Games
Commonwealth Games medallists in diving
Commonwealth Games bronze medallists for Canada
20th-century Canadian women
Medallists at the 1982 Commonwealth Games
Medallists at the 1986 Commonwealth Games